Szentgyörgyvölgy is a village in Zala County, Hungary. It has a Reform Church built in 1517. It lies on the Slovenian border. It currently has a population of around 500 people. It has a Catholic church. There is one bed and breakfast, called Molnárporta after the owner. Close towns include: Csesztreg, Szílvágy, Porszombat and is one hour away from the capital of Zala county, Zalaegerszeg.

References

External links

Populated places in Zala County